James Henry Tate (March 5, 1830April 18, 1918) was an American merchant, farmer, and Republican politician.  He was a member of the Wisconsin State Senate (1876 & 1877) and  representing Vernon County.

Biography

Born in Landgrove, Vermont, where he was raised on his family's farm, he moved to Boston, Massachusetts, in 1847 where he was a clerk. In 1849, he moved to California and then back to Boston. In 1860, Tate moved to Rhode Island. During the American Civil War, he enlisted in the 2nd Rhode Island Infantry and was a commissary sergeant. Then, in 1865, Tate settled in Viroqua, Wisconsin, where he owned a store. He also owned another store in Cashton, Wisconsin. Tate served in the Wisconsin State Assembly as a Republican and then served in the Wisconsin State Senate in 1876 and 1877.

References

1830 births
1918 deaths
People from Landgrove, Vermont
People from Viroqua, Wisconsin
Businesspeople from Wisconsin
Republican Party members of the Wisconsin State Assembly
Republican Party Wisconsin state senators
19th-century American businesspeople
People of Rhode Island in the American Civil War
Union Army officers